Some Things Never Leave You (STNLY) is the fourth full-length studio album by American alternative-rock band Sherwood. The album was released on June 17, 2016.

Background
After a four-year hiatus, Sherwood returned in September 2015 with the announcement of a new album. Free from a recording contract, Sherwood financed the album via a crowdfunding campaign and released STNLY through the BC Music label.

Recording

Featuring original members Nate Henry, Dan Koch and Joe Greenetz, STNLY was recorded in late 2015 at various studios in Seattle, WA, including Stone Gossard's Studio Litho, as well as the studios of producer Luke Vander Pol and guitarist/songwriter Koch. The tracks were mixed by Matt Goldman in Atlanta, GA and mastered by Ed Brooks at RFI Mastering in Seattle. It is Sherwood's first full-length record without longtime keyboardist Mike Leibovich.

Reception

Upon its release, Some Things Never Leave You received critical praise, with reviewers noting its songwriting, performances, and ability to cover new (for the band) sonic territory while retaining the youthful earnestness of Sherwood's work from the early-to-mid-2000s.

Track listing

Charts

References

External links
Sherwood - Some Things Never Leave You - Amazon.com Music

2016 albums
Sherwood (band) albums